Microporidae is a family of bryozoans belonging to the order Cheilostomatida.

Genera

Genera:
 Andreella Jullien, 1888
 Aviculiera Zágoršek, 2001
 Calpensia Jullien, 1888

References

Bryozoan families